Joël Prévost (born Richard-Jacques Bonay, 16 February 1950, Narbonne, Aude) is a French singer, best known for his participation in the 1978 Eurovision Song Contest.

Born in the Languedoc-Roussillon region of southern France, Prévost was adopted soon after birth by a family from northern France, renamed Jean-Luc Potaux, and grew up at Trith-Saint-Léger, close to the border with Belgium. He moved to Paris in 1970 and in 1972 signed a contract with CBS Records, releasing a string of singles and touring over the next few years with artists such as Serge Gainsbourg, Mike Brant, Michèle Torr and Serge Lama.

In 1977, Prévost entered the French Eurovision selection with the song "Pour oublier Barbara", but failed to progress from the semi-final. The following year, his song "Il y aura toujours des violons" ("There Will Always Be Violins") was chosen as the French representative for the 23rd Eurovision Song Contest. Strangely, the song only finished second in the French semi-final before emerging the clear winner in the final. As a result of Marie Myriam's victory for France the previous year, the 1978 Eurovision was held in Paris on 22 April. Although "Il y aura toujours des violons" was a very traditional, old-style ballad with no concession to the musical trends of the late 1970s, it finished the evening in third place of the 20 entries.

Prévost remains active, having played residencies at the Paris Olympia, Alhambra (Paris) and toured extensively for several years throughout Africa.

References

External links 
 MySpace page
 Discography and cover art at encyclopédisque.fr

1950 births
Living people
People from Narbonne
French male singers
Eurovision Song Contest entrants for France
Eurovision Song Contest entrants of 1978